KSFR-FM is a broadcast radio station licensed to White Rock, New Mexico, and serving the Santa Fe area broadcasting on 101.1 FM.

KSFR is Santa Fe, New Mexico's community/public radio station. It is owned by the Santa Fe Community College and managed by the 501(c)(3) non-profit Northern New Mexico Radio Foundation.

The station features a wide variety of locally-produced music, news and talk shows, as well as programming from the BBC, Democracy Now, and other national programs. KSFR's news team won the Associated Press' "New Mexico Station of the Year" award in 2004, 2005, and 2006. In 2015, the New Mexico Broadcasters Association named KSFR "Best Radio Station" in a large market.

The station originally broadcast at 90.7 FM. In July 2007, KSFR moved to 101.1 FM, becoming one of a handful of public radio stations nationally whose frequency is outside of the assigned spectrum for non-commercial stations (88-91 FM).

History
101.1 White Rock had aired commercial programming before 2007. Over the years it has had an Oldies format as KNLA "LA 101" in the early 1990s and a '70s' hits format as KSFQ "Q 101" later in the decade. In 2000 it switched to Hot AC as "Mix 101" but would shift to rhythmic oldies after Clear Channel bought the station. It began a smooth jazz format called "The Cat" in early 2005 which ended in July 2007.

After Clear Channel announced its plan to go private in November 2006, they announced they intended to sell most of their radio stations outside of the top 100 Arbitron markets - including their Santa Fe-only stations KSFQ and KBAC. Both were sold to Educational Media Foundation, a religious broadcaster in 2007 however KBAC 98.1 was soon sold to Hutton Broadcasting so it could retain its locally programmed adult album alternative format.

On June 29, 2007, KSFQ and KSFR (owned by Santa Fe Community College) announced that they intended on doing a frequency swap in the next three months, moving KSFQ to 90.7 FM and KSFR to 101.1 FM, with KSFR expanding its broadcast area south into Albuquerque and north into Taos. When the transition was completed, KSFR was simulcasting on both the 90.7 and 101.1 frequencies until the deal was approved by the FCC. 90.7 is now KQLV "K-Love" a Christian Contemporary music format.

Call letters 

The call letters were originally used by an independent San Francisco classical music FM station, which began broadcasting on March 11, 1958. Al Levitt, its co-owner and General Manager was one of the principal hosts. Program Director Bill Agee and Bruce Johansen, who later became President and CEO of NATPE (the National Association of Television Program Executives) were the other main personalities of this concert station. KSFR was purchased by Metromedia in October 1966. Metromedia began switching to a rock music format in the spring of 1968 and, on May 21, 1968, they changed the call letters of KSFR San Francisco to KSAN.

See also
List of community radio stations in the United States

References

External links 
 
 
 
 
 KSFR, San Francisco history-1968 audio of change from classical to rock

SFR-FM
Santa Fe County, New Mexico
Community radio stations in the United States
Radio stations established in 1966